Organic egg production is the production of eggs through organic means. In this process, the poultry are fed organic feed. According to the United States Department of Agriculture, organic means that the laying hens must have access to the outdoors and cannot be raised in cages. Only natural molting can occur within the flock; forced molting is not allowed. Organic certification also requires maintenance of basic animal welfare standards.

Differences between "free range" and "organic"

Significant differences cover feed, medication, and animal welfare. Organic hens are fed organic feed; it is prohibited to feed animal byproducts or GMO crops – which is not disallowed in free range environments; no antibiotics allowed except in emergencies (in free range,  it is up to the farmer, but the same levels of antibiotics as conventional farming is allowed); required animal welfare standards in organic farms are higher, which can improve the quality of both the eggs and the meat.

In the European Union (EU), to identify and trace egg production, a unique code must legally be printed on all eggs. A "0" code distinguishes organic farming eggs. The regulation on egg marking includes four levels with strict requirements on husbandry conditions. While free-range and indoor keeping requires 1100 cm² indoor space per hen it makes 1667 cm² (or 6 hens per square meter) the minimum for organic farming.

Organic feed
Organic feed is grown without the use of genetically modified organisms (GMOs), synthetic fertilizers, pesticides or herbicides. It is often grown by certified organic farmers, whose practices are monitored for three years prior to being certified organic. If the crop is contaminated by cross-fertilization with GMOs, it is rendered useless for organic grading. Finally, there can be no animal by-products in organic feed.

Living conditions

In the United States, "organic" egg production means that the flock may not live in cages and must have access to outdoor areas.

Antibiotics
Organic egg producers cannot feed low-level antibiotics to the poultry. Antibiotics are only allowed during an outbreak of infection or disease.

Molting

Some farms induce molting in their flocks to affect egg production.  In organic egg farms, the birds are allowed to go into a natural molt but are not induced.

Animal welfare
Meat, poultry, eggs, and dairy products labeled "organic" must come from animals who are " without antibiotics, added growth hormones, mammalian or avian byproducts, or other prohibited feed ingredients." Farms, processors, and distributors must be inspected by the USDA before they are allowed to use the "organic" label. However, fewer than 5 percent of chickens are raised in accordance with these standards. The "organic" label does not guarantee that animals were treated any better than those raised on conventional CAFOs. The Washington Post reported that large operations are able to sell their eggs as organic because the USDA has "interpreted the word 'outdoors' in such a way that farms that confine their hens to barns but add 'porches' are deemed eligible for the valuable 'USDA Organic' label. The porches are typically walled-in areas with a roof, hard floors and screening on one side." Male chicks who are born on organic or free-range egg farms are still discarded, by the use of lethal gas, because they do not produce eggs.

See also
 Organic certification
 Free range eggs
 Free range
 Pastured poultry
 The Happy Egg Company
 Battery cage

References

Further reading
Organic Poultry and Eggs Capture Growing Share of Specialty Markets

Organic farming
Poultry farming
Eggs (food)